The 2015–16 UT Martin Skyhawks men's basketball team represented the University of Tennessee at Martin during the 2015–16 NCAA Division I men's basketball season. The Skyhawks, led by second year head coach Heath Schroyer, played their home games at Skyhawk Arena and were members of the West Division of the Ohio Valley Conference. They finished the season 20–15, 10–6 in OVC play to share the West Division championship with Murray State. They defeated Morehead State to advance to the championship game of the OVC tournament where they lost to Austin Peay. They were invited to the CollegeInsider.com Tournament where they defeated Central Michigan in the first round before losing in the second round to Ball State.

Following the season, head coach Heath Schroyer left UT Martin to become an assistant at NC State.

Previous season 
The Skyhawks finished the 2014–15 season 21–13, 10–6 in OVC play to finish in second place in the West Division. They lost in the quarterfinals of the OVC tournament to Morehead State. They were invited to the CollegeInsider.com Tournament where they defeated Northwestern State in the first round, USC Upstate in the second round, and Eastern Kentucky in the quarterfinals. In the CIT semifinals, they lost to Evansville.

Roster

Schedule

|-
!colspan=9 style=| Exhibition

|-
!colspan=9 style=| Non–Conference Regular Season

|-
!colspan=9 style=| Ohio Valley Conference Regular Season

|-
!colspan=9 style=| Ohio Valley Conference tournament

 
|-
!colspan=9 style=| CIT

References

UT Martin Skyhawks men's basketball seasons
Tennessee-Martin
Tennessee-Martin